More Than Just a DJ is the third studio album by DJ Kay Slay. It was released on February 9, 2010.

Album information 
The album was originally set to be released on October 13, 2009 then it was pushed back to November 10, 2009. The third time the album was pushed was due to the album's first single "Blockstars" which originally featured Plies, was replaced by Yo Gotti because according to Kayslay, Plies could not be found when it was time to shoot the video.

Guests and production 
Kayslay originally called on collaborators ranging from 50 Cent, Lloyd Banks, Tony Yayo, Busta Rhymes, Saigon, Drake, Ray J, Rell, Nicole Wray, Jim Jones, Juelz Santana, Hell Rell, JR Writer, Cam'ron, AZ, Raekwon, Ghostface Killah, Maino, Red Cafe and longtime collaborator Papoose for the project. Some of these collaborators weren't included on the album though, they were replaced with different artists and/or songs with different artists featured on them.

Track listing

Samples
 Gangsta Shit : The Detroit Spinners - Since I Been Gone

Charts

References 

2010 albums
DJ Kay Slay albums
Albums produced by the Alchemist (musician)
Albums produced by Zaytoven
Albums produced by DJ Scratch
Albums produced by Grind Music
Albums produced by Mr. Porter
Albums produced by AraabMuzik
E1 Music albums